2312 Duboshin, provisional designation , is a dark Hildian asteroid from the outermost regions of the asteroid belt, approximately  in diameter. It was discovered on 1 April 1976, by Soviet–Russian astronomer Nikolai Chernykh at the Crimean Astrophysical Observatory in Nauchnij, on the Crimean peninsula. It was named after Russian astronomer Georgij Duboshin. The D-type asteroid has a longer than average rotation period of 50.78 hours.

Orbit and classification 

Duboshin is an asteroids of the dynamical Hilda group which stay in a 3:2 orbital resonance with Jupiter. It is, however, not a member of the collisional Hilda family but a non-family asteroid of the main belt's background population when applying the hierarchical clustering method to its proper orbital elements.

It orbits the Sun in the outermost asteroid belt at a distance of 3.3–4.6 AU once every 7 years and 11 months (2,880 days; semi-major axis of 3.96 AU). Its orbit has an eccentricity of 0.16 and an inclination of 5° with respect to the ecliptic.

Physical characteristics 

In the Tholen classification, Duboshin is a dark D-type asteroid. The Wide-field Infrared Survey Explorer (WISE) also characterized it as a D-type.

Rotation period 

In April 2016, a rotational lightcurve of Duboshin was obtained from photometric observations by Robert Stephens at the Center for Solar System Studies  in California. Lightcurve analysis gave a long rotation period of 50.78 hours with a brightness amplitude of 0.15 magnitude, indicative for a nearly spherical shape. While not being a slow rotator, it has a notably longer period than that seen for most other asteroids, which rotate every 2 to 20 hours once around their axis.

Diameter and albedo 

According to the surveys carried out by the Infrared Astronomical Satellite IRAS, the Japanese Akari satellite and the NEOWISE mission of NASA's WISE telescope, Duboshin measures between 50.122 and 58.53 kilometers in diameter and its surface has an albedo between 0.044 and 0.06.

The Collaborative Asteroid Lightcurve Link adopts the results obtained by IRAS, that is, an albedo of 0.0496 and a diameter of 54.94 kilometers based on an absolute magnitude of 10.18.

Naming 

This minor planet was named after Russian astronomer Georgij Nikolaevich Duboshin (1904–1986), expert on celestial mechanics, author of several textbooks, and former president of IAU's Commission 7, Celestial Mechanics and Dynamical Astronomy in the early 1970s. The official naming citation was published by the Minor Planet Center on 1 December 1982.

Notes

References

External links 
 Asteroid Lightcurve Database (LCDB), query form (info )
 Dictionary of Minor Planet Names, Google books
 Asteroids and comets rotation curves, CdR – Observatoire de Genève, Raoul Behrend
 Discovery Circumstances: Numbered Minor Planets (1)-(5000) – Minor Planet Center
 
 

002312
Discoveries by Nikolai Chernykh
Named minor planets
002312
19760401